Paposo or Caleta Paposo is a hamlet in the southern part of Antofagasta Province, Chile. It is located on a narrow coastal plain bordering the Pacific Ocean. The census of 2002 counted 259 inhabitants, who predominantly relied on fishing and mining for a living. Paposo has a desert climate, and "fog oases" exist on mountain slopes a few kilometers inland.  In a region almost devoid of vegetation, these oases, also called lomas, support a variety of flora.

Geography and climate
Paposo is located adjacent to a cove on the coast of the Pacific Ocean in the Atacama desert, the driest non-polar desert in the world. Vegetation is nearly absent in most of the Atacama.

Paposo and the Atacama have the BWn (desert) climate in the Köppen Classification, characterized by mild temperatures, unusual in desert climates, and much fog rolling in from the nearby ocean. July has the most precipitation averaging .

The climatic feature which permits the growth of vegetation on the slopes of the mountains rising above Paposo is the Garua or Camanchaca -- cloud banks caused by the cold waters of the ocean. The moisture that makes up the clouds measures between 1 and 40 microns across, producing mist and drizzle but too fine to form rain droplets.

References

Atacama Desert
Fog
Populated places in Antofagasta Province